The Legislative Assembly of the State of Pará is the unicameral legislature of Pará state in Brazil. It has 41 state deputies elected by proportional representation.

The first legislature began on March 13, 1885, in a palace where today is the Square Dom Pedro II (destroyed by a fire in 1959), it was moved in 1960 to the Teatro da Paz and in 1970 to the current headquarters, the Palácio Cabanagem.

References

External links
Official website

Pará
Para
Para